Giampiero Simoni (born 12 September 1969 in Porto San Giorgio) is an Italian former racing driver who made his name in Touring Car racing.

Racing career

His racing career started in karting, becoming world kart champion in 1987. In 1990 he entered the Italian Formula Three Championship. After driving for two years in Formula 3000 (1992–93), he spent two years in the British Touring Car Championship (1994–95), driving for the Alfa Romeo works team in an Alfa Romeo 155. In his first year, he finished 5th in the championship in a dominant team alongside eventual champion Gabriele Tarquini, winning one race in the season. In 1995 the car no longer had the aerodynamic advantage over other teams and he finished a lowly 17th after only driving a part season. 1995 was also spent driving selected races in the DTM. Afterwards, 1996 saw him race in the All Japan GT Championship in a GT500 Toyota Supra. Thereafter his racing activities were sporadic, including a couple of appearances in the 1997 Belgian Procar Championship.

Racing record

Complete British Touring Car Championship results
(key) (Races in bold indicate pole position) (Races in italics indicate fastest lap)

Complete Deutsche Tourenwagen Meisterschaft Results
(key) (Races in bold indicate pole position) (Races in italics indicate fastest lap)

Complete Spanish Touring Car Championship results 
(key) (Races in bold indicate pole position; races in italics indicate fastest lap.)

† Not eligible for points.

References

1969 births
Living people
Sportspeople from the Province of Fermo
Italian racing drivers
British Touring Car Championship drivers
Italian Formula Three Championship drivers
Karting World Championship drivers